The Stratagem and other Stories is a small book of short stories written by Aleister Crowley (1875–1947), occult magician, poet and self-proclaimed prophet of a new Æon.

Contents 

The book was originally published in 1929 and one of a series of Crowley's works to be published by Mandrake Press after a period in which Crowley found it difficult to publish due both to his lack of funds, and his notoriety.  Mandrake Press also published The Confessions of Aleister Crowley volumes I and II, and Moonchild.

Crowley published few collections of short stories, but the title story received such a good review from British novelist Joseph Conrad when he published it in The English Review that he thought it was a possible calling to conventional fame.

The second story, "The Testament of Magdalen Blair," is the longest of the three and was originally published in The Equinox volume I, no.9 in 1913. It tells the haunting story of a psychic woman who delves into the dying, subconscious psyche of her husband and bears resemblance to Edgar Allan Poe's "Mesmeric Revelation" and "The Facts in the Case of M. Valdemar".

The third short story, "His Secret Sin", was first published in The Equinox volume I, no.8 in 1912 and has a pervert absconding with a photograph of the Venus de Milo.

The inscription at the front of the book read:

"To the Memories of Three Dead Friends: Joseph Conrad, who applauded the first story; Allan Bennett, Bhikku Ananda Metteya, who suggested the second, and Eugene John Weiland, who bowled me out over the third."

Editions 
 Mandrake Press, UK, 1929
 Temple Press, UK, 1990,

References

See also 

 Collected Works of Aleister Crowley 1905-1907
 Works of Aleister Crowley
 Libri of Aleister Crowley
 Clouds without Water

1929 short story collections
Fantasy short story collections
Works by Aleister Crowley
British short story collections